Emanuele Formichetti (born 28 May 1983) is an Italian long jumper.

Biography
On 30 June 2010, at Italian Championships in Grosseto, held second place behind Andrew Howe, got the tenth best Italian benefit of all time with measuring 8.10 meters.

Achievements

See also
 Italian all-time lists - Long jump

References

External links
 

1983 births
Italian male long jumpers
Living people
Athletics competitors of Gruppo Sportivo Esercito